Issac Delgado (born Isaac Felipe Delgado-Ramirez on April 11, 1962 in Marianao, Habana, Cuba) is one of the founders of the band NG La Banda  and is a popular salsa and timba performer.

Early life and family
His father, Luis Delgado, was a tailor and his mother, Lina Ramirez, was an actress, dancer and singer in the Teatro Musical de La Habana.  When he was ten years old he entered the Amadeo Roldan Conservatory where he studied violoncello, an instrument that did not interest him. At twelve he left the conservatory, and pursued the study of sports and football. He later graduated in sport education.  At 18, Isaac joined the group "Proyecto" at the request of the pianist, Gonzalo Rubalcaba. This sparked his innate love for music.  It was at this point that he decided to study vocal technique with one of the best vocal instructors in Cuba, Mariana De Gonish.  He also enrolled in the school for professional musicians, "Ignacio Cervantes".

Professional life
Issac Delgado began his professional career in 1983 when he joined Orquesta de Pacho Alonso. He travelled internationally with the orchestra and recorded a CD with them, his first commercial recording. In 1987 he became the vocalist for Galaxia, who also recorded a CD.

NG la Banda and the birth of timba
In 1988, Delgado became the lead vocalist for the group NG La Banda. It was with this group that he found fame. NG was the band that launched the timba revolution, the first new popular Cuban music genre in decades. As NG's lead vocalist, Delgado was at the cutting edge of Cuban dance music. His singing talents soon brought him to superstar status within the fast-growing timba field. Delgado became one of timba's best composers and a uniquely creative melodic improviser. In concert he often improvises words and melodies for periods of several minutes. He recorded three CDs with NG and was awarded the EGREM prize for 1990–1991.

Solo career
In 1991 Delgado put together his own band and recorded the CD, Dando La Hora under the artistic direction of Gonzalo Rubalcaba. This album received the 1992 EGREM Prize. His second CD, Con Ganas, again with Rubalcaba, received two EGREM prizes in 1993.

In 1994 he received another EGREM award for his CD El chevere de la salsa y el caballero del son. His next album was El Año Que Viene. He later travelled to the United States to perform in the Festival of Salsa in New York's Madison Square Garden with Celia Cruz, José Alberto "El Canario", and Grupo Niche. In New York he recorded another album, Otra Ideal. In 1997 he performed at the festival, Guerra de la Salsa with La India, Rey Ruiz, and Tony Vega.

At this point in his career, Delgado was recording with both New York salsa musicians and Cuban timba musicians. Some of his recorded material sounds like salsa, but with distinctive timba elements periodically emerging to the surface. While some timba fans may have been disappointed hearing Delgado in a tamer and more polished salsa sound, the singer continued to record songs with leading timba musicians. Consequently, much of his post-NG material contains some of the most innovative instrumental accompaniment within the context of Cuban-style dance music.

The overall sound of Delgado's recordings from this period sound far more like salsa than timba, However, little details in the arrangements reveal the handiwork of some of Cuba's most important innovators. Delgado's 1994 hit "La Sandunguita" (composed by his bassist Alain Pérez) took unprecedented liberties with clave, that are considered "sacrilegious" to old school musicians (Peñalosa 2012: 246). While such innovations further aggravated the salsa—timba clave schism, there is no disagreement that "La sandunguita" swings.

Delgado's most famous group (1996‐1998) was with Alain Pérez on bass and Iván "Melón" Lewis on piano. Of particular note was the band's ability to spontaneously change the arrangement during performances. They were able to produce changes spontaneously by using flexible rhythm section schemes allowing them to alter the form of an arrangement to fit the flow of each performance (Moore 2012: 91). When the entire rhythm section of this band moved to Spain, Delgado added Antonio "Pachá" Portuondo on timbales and Denis "Papacho" Savón on congas. He then convinced drummer Yoel Páez, bassist Joel Domínguez, and pianist Yaniel "El Majá" Matos to leave Paulito FG's band to join him.

The following piano guajeo (or piano tumbao), created by Lewis is from "No me mires a los ojos." It is a prime example of one of the most critical timba piano innovations—the idea that the piano tumbao be a "hook" by which the song can be identified and that contributes greatly to the song's popularity. There are three places where the left hand adds an extra note between two right hand notes, a technique never used before in timba, which has become a major timba piano innovation. Melón was the first to use it as a central part of his style (Moore 2010 pt. 6.). Listen: "No me Mires a los ojos" by Issac Delgado.

Lewis's piano guajeo on Delgado's "La temática" incorporates the technique of pattern displacement. A series of repeated octaves invoke a characteristic metric ambiguity (Moore 2010: pt. 4. 96-108).

In 2006 Delgado went to the U.S. to work on a new album. In May 2007 he released En Primera Plana. He followed up with an album entitled, Así Soy in October 2008. In 2011, Delgado released a maxi-single with La India in four different versions titled, "Que No Se Te Olvide."

Issac latest recording is "Lluvia y Fuego" (2019/Egrem) and features new original classics as well as tributes to Benny Moré and Cheo Feliciano.

Discography
 No te compliques (NG La Banda) (1988)
 En la calle (NG la Banda) (1989)
 No se puede tapar el sol (NG la Banda) (1990)
 Dando la hora (1992)
 Con ganas (1993)
 El chévere de la salsa y el caballero de son (with Adalberto Álvarez) (1994)
 El año que viene (1995)
 Otra idea (1996)
 Exclusivo para cuba (1997)
 La primera noche (1998)
 La fórmula (2000)
 Grandes éxitos
 Versos en el cielo (2002)
 Prohibido (2004)
 En primera plana (2007)
 Así soy (2008)
 L.O.V.E. (2010)
 Supercubano (2011)
 Lluvia Y Fuego (2019)

References

 The Miami Herald; April 25, 2007
 Moore, Kevin (2010) Beyond Salsa Piano v. 9 Iván "Melón" Lewis, pt. 4. .
 Moore, Kevin (2010) Beyond Salsa Piano v. 9 Iván "Melón" Lewis, pt. 6. .
 Moore, Kevin (2012) Beyond Salsa for Beginners; The Cuban Timba Revolution. 
 Peñalosa, David (2012). The Clave Matrix; Afro-Cuban Rhythm: Its Principles and African Origins. 
 Timba.com Issac Delgado

1962 births
Living people
American entertainers of Cuban descent
Cuban male singers
Cuban musicians
Cuban emigrants to the United States
Salsa musicians
Latin Grammy Award winners
Latin music songwriters